Lee Se-Joo (born October 2, 1987) is a South Korean football player who played for Incheon United from 2006 to 2011.

It was confirmed in August 2011 that he would be dismissed from the all league system in South Korea for up to two years, after being implicated in the match-fixing scandal.

References

1987 births
Living people
South Korean footballers
Incheon United FC players
Association football midfielders